Rudolf Berthold (1 April 1903 – December 1976) was a German international footballer.

References

1903 births
1976 deaths
Association football midfielders
German footballers
Germany international footballers